The Rutgers Scarlet Knights men's soccer team is a varsity intercollegiate athletic team of Rutgers University–New Brunswick in New Brunswick, New Jersey, United States. The team is a member of the Big Ten Conference, which is part of the National Collegiate Athletic Association's Division I. Rutgers's first varsity's men's soccer team was fielded in 1938, although organized soccer has been played at the university since at least 1869. The team plays its home games at Yurcak Field in New Brunswick. The Knights are coached by Jim McElderry.

History 

The origins of Rutgers soccer trace back to the 1869 college soccer season, where the first ever collegiate soccer game was played in the United States. The then-Rutgers College (now Rutgers University) and the College of New Jersey (now Princeton University) played an exhibition match that ended in a 6–4 result. Rutgers won the game by a score of 6–4 In addition to being considered one of the earlier soccer games reported in the United States, these two games are considered to be the first organized American college football games to ever be played.

Rutgers' first varsity team was fielded in 1938, where they Knights competed as an independent team. Rutgers remained unaffiliated with any formal athletic conference and was considered an independent until joining the Atlantic 10 Conference as an associate soccer member in the mid-1980s. The Knights Big East Conference for soccer in 1995. On July 1, 2014, Rutgers became a member of the Big Ten athletic conference, after paying an $11.5 million exit fee to the American Athletic Conference (which formed as a result of the splitting of the Big East Conference).

Roster

Head coaching history 
There have been five coaches in Rutgers' history.

* Geza Kiss was an interim coach.

Individual achievements

All-Americans 

Rutgers has produced eight All-Americans.

Notes

References

External links

 

 
1938 establishments in New Jersey
Association football clubs established in 1938